The 1997–98 New York Islanders season was the 26th season in the franchise's history. The Islanders missed the playoffs for the fourth consecutive year.

Off-season
In June 1997, New York Islanders general manager Mike Milbury extended an invitation to Cammi Granato to attend Islanders training camp. Granato eventually declined.

Defenseman Bryan McCabe was named team captain.

Regular season
In February, Bryan McCabe was traded to the Vancouver Canucks in exchange for Trevor Linden, who's named the Islanders' new captain upon arrival.

The Islanders tied the Chicago Blackhawks, Florida Panthers and Pittsburgh Penguins for most short-handed goals allowed with 16.

Final standings

Schedule and results

Player statistics

Regular season
Scoring

Goaltending

Note: Pos = Position; GP = Games played; G = Goals; A = Assists; Pts = Points; +/- = plus/minus; PIM = Penalty minutes; PPG = Power-play goals; SHG = Short-handed goals; GWG = Game-winning goals
      MIN = Minutes played; W = Wins; L = Losses; T = Ties; GA = Goals-against; GAA = Goals-against average; SO = Shutouts; SA = Shots against; SV = Shots saved; SV% = Save percentage;

Awards and records

Transactions

Draft picks
New York's draft picks at the 1997 NHL Entry Draft held at the Civic Arena in Pittsburgh, Pennsylvania.

References
 

New York Islanders seasons
New York Islanders
New York Islanders
New York Islanders
New York Islanders